Feprosidnine (Sydnophen) is a stimulant drug which was developed in the USSR in the 1970s. It is structurally related to another Russian drug mesocarb but unlike mesocarb, was withdrawn earlier from production. In comparison with mesocarb it has own antidepressant activity, which makes it useful in treating depressions. Indications of feprosidnine included apathic, asthenic depressions, fatigue, apathic syndrome, narcolepsy and other similar conditions. Therapeutic range of doses: 10-50mg a day.
Sydnophen has multiple mechanisms of action, the relative importance of which has not been clearly established. Effects on the body include reversible monoamine oxidase inhibition, cholinergic, adrenergic, opioid and nitric oxide donating actions, all of which may contribute to its pharmacological effects to some extent.

Chemistry 
Feprosidnine is a mesoionic sydnone imine.

References 

Stimulants
Oxadiazoles
Russian drugs
Monoamine releasing agents
Drugs in the Soviet Union